The 1950 Southern Jaguars football team was an American football team that represented Southern University in the 1950 college football season. In their 15th season under head coach Ace Mumford, the Jaguars compiled a 10–0–1 record, won the SWAC championship, shut out seven of 11 opponents, and outscored all opponents by a total of 276 to 26. The team played its home games at University Stadium in Baton Rouge, Louisiana.

The team was recognized as the black college national co-champion. The only setback was a scoreless tie with Jake Gaither's national co-champion Florida A&M. In the final Dickinson rankings, three undefeated black colleges received the following point totals: Florida A&M (28.76); Southern (28.50); and Maryland State (28.00).  However, Florida A&M lost to Wilberforce in the Orange Blossom Classic, after the final Dickinson rankings were released.

Schedule

References

Southern
Southern Jaguars football seasons
Southwestern Athletic Conference football champion seasons
Black college football national champions
College football undefeated seasons
Southern Jaguars football